Last Week Tonight with John Oliver is an American late-night talk show created and hosted by John Oliver for HBO. The show takes a satirical look at the week in news, politics and current events.

 The tenth season of the show premiered on February 19, 2023.

Series overview

Episodes

Season 1 (2014)

Season 2 (2015)

Season 3 (2016)

Season 4 (2017)

Season 5 (2018)

Season 6 (2019)

Season 7 (2020) 
Note: Due to social distancing measures put in place as a result of the COVID-19 pandemic, episode 184 was filmed at an unspecified location. Episodes 185–231 were filmed at John Oliver's home.

Season 8 (2021)

Season 9 (2022)

Season 10 (2023)

Web exclusives

References

Episodes
Last Week Tonight with John Oliver
Last Week Tonight